Saw Tun (also spelt Saw Htun; born 1 September 1966) is a Burmese politician who currently serves as a Pyithu Hluttaw member of parliament for Mudon Township. He is a member of the National League for Democracy politician.

Early life and education
Saw Tun was born on 1 September 1966 in Mudon, Mon State, Myanmar. He is an ethnic Mon. He graduated with B.Sc (physics) from Mawlamyine University.

Political career
He is a member of the National League for Democracy Party politician, he was elected as Pyithu Hluttaw representative for Mudon parliamentary constituency.

References

National League for Democracy politicians
1966 births
Living people
People from Mon State
Burmese people of Mon descent